John Lavalle (died 1916) was an American architect. He designed buildings in Maine, Massachusetts, Montana, and New Hampshire, including three cottages in Islesboro, Maine in 1898-1890, and the Amory House in Dublin, New Hampshire in 1898-1899 (later listed on the National Register of Historic Places).

References

External links
Juan Schutte “John” Lavalle on Find a Grave

1916 deaths
Architects from Boston
20th-century American architects